Araneus asiaticus is a spider in the genus Araneus, found in Kyrgyzstan.

References 

asiaticus
Spiders of Asia
Spiders described in 1983